The Rudăreasa is a left tributary of the Latorița in Romania. It discharges into the Latorița in Ciungetu.

Tributaries

The following rivers are tributaries to the river Rudăreasa (from source to mouth):

Left: Poiana Mică, Ștevia
Right: Pârâul Stânei Bătrâne, Părăginosu, Barbocet, Pârâul Negrenilor, Pârâul Sec, Pârâul lui Ciucă, Dolia Frumoasă, Pârâul Bârloagelor, Gruiul Negru

References

Rivers of Romania
Rivers of Vâlcea County